, or simply Kobe Zoo or , is a municipal zoo in Kobe, Japan.

Attractions 

Giant pandas since 2000.

  An indoor educational center featuring skeletal specimens and a reading room.

  tigers, lions, leopards, snow leopards, and jaguars.

  Aboveground and underwater viewing areas

  red pandas, otters, koalas and some farmyard animals.

 A small  Rides and games for children, includes a Ferris wheel and chair swing ride.

 The  The former residence of the founder of Osaka Iron Works, Edward Hazlett Hunter. An elaborate example of a 19th-century , it is at the northeast corner the zoo (hence not accessible outside zoo hours). The interior – with roped-off period furniture – is only open a few months each year. It was designated an Important Cultural Property by both the prefecture and the nation.

Animals in other sections include giraffes, zebras, kangaroos, ostriches, flamingos, hippos, some species of apes, crocodiles, bobcats, sea lions, snow owls, and elephants.

Surrounding 

Technically the zoo is within , but the zoo is enclosed and has admission fees. Surrounding the zoo are the various parts of a sports complex. To the northeast are some tennis courts; to the east is Ōji Stadium; to the southwest is the Museum of Literature.

References

External links
 

Zoos in Japan
Zoos established in 1951
1951 establishments in Japan
Tourist attractions in Hyōgo Prefecture